Woodside is a village in County Durham, England. In the 2001 census Woodside had a population of 153.

References

External links

Villages in County Durham